Vipin Kumar Tripathi (alternately known as VK Tripathi; born 11 March 1948) is an Indian Plasma physicist and a former Physics professor of the IIT, Delhi.

Early life and education
Tripathi was born in Jhansi, Uttar Pradesh on 11 March 1948. He did his Masters from Agra University and completed his PhD from Indian Institute of Technology Delhi.

Career
Tripathi started his career as a lecturer with IIT, Delhi in 1970. He joined University of Maryland in 1976 as a Post-Doctoral Researcher and then a Research Associate. He was involved in the research on radio frequency heating of fusion plasma's in the university. In 1983, He joined Indian Institute of Technology Delhi as a Professor of Physics where he served for about 30 years.

Sadbhav Mission
Sadbhav Mission aims to develop a grassroots resistance against communalism and mobilizing people on basic issues like education, as stated on its official website. Professor Tripathi established it in the aftermath of Bhagalpur riots in 1990. Professor Tripathi through the Sadbhav Mission has written and distributed pamphlets on the issues like Abrogation of Article 370 and CAA as a mode of protest.

Publications
Tripathi's publications include:
Parametric instabilities in laser produced plasmas. 
 Thermonuclear fusion
 Plasma-aided radiation guiding in a free-electron laser
 Stimulated Brillouin scattering of a laser beam in a plasma channel
 Cherenkov Terahertz Generation by Electron Bunches in a Dielectric Lined Resonator
Theoretical Modeling and Experimental Verification of the Permeability Measurements of Thick Films at Microwave Frequencies
Laser wakefield bubble regime acceleration of electrons in a preformed non uniform plasma channel
 Plasmonics
 High power laser plasma interaction
 Fundamentals of plasma physics

References

1948 births
Living people
Indian physicists
Indian plasma physicists
People from Jhansi
IIT Delhi alumni